Jacques Guérin-Desjardins (November 1894 – 1982) was the National Commissioner of Eclaireurs Unionistes de France from 1923 to 1936. He had been a Boy Scout in Britain where he was educated, attended the Birmingham Scout Rally in 1913, and served as the interpreter of Lord Baden-Powell at International Conferences and World Jamborees. He was a recipient of the Silver Wolf Award, the highest award made by The Scout Association "for services of the most exceptional character.".

He was a lieutenant at Verdun, a recipient of the Croix de Guerre with citations, Légion d’Honneur and was promoted to captain in 1940 with a second Croix de Guerre. He married Antoinette Nègre from Nîmes, was the father of three children, the eldest of whom was Arnaud Desjardins. Later, he was a Human Resources Director at Peugeot.

References

1894 births
Place of birth missing
People from Normandy
1982 deaths
Place of death missing
Scouting and Guiding in France
Scouting pioneers
The Scout Association